Israel Yaakov Algazi (1680–1757) was a Jewish rabbi of Izmir and Jerusalem, who served as Rishon Letzion for the last few years of his life.

Biography
He was born to Rabbi Yom Tov Alghazi and grew up in Izmir. He studied with Rabbi Hayyim ben Jacob Abulafia and Isaac HaKohen Rapoport.

In Izmir, he initiated the printing of the Kabbalistic book Hemdat Yamim (of unknown authorship, but which some attribute to Alghazi himself).

In the year 5495 (1734-1735) Algazi moved to Ottoman Palestine. He studied in the Beit El kabbalistic yeshiva. He was a member of the beit din of Eliezer Nachum. He served as the head of "Yeshivat Neve Shalom Brit Avraham" in which the greatest Jewish scholars of Jerusalem learned.

The Rishon Letzion Nisim Haim Moshe Mizrahi died in 1749. In 1749 or 1755 Alghazi was appointed Rishon Letzion in his place.

Alghazi died on 10 Tammuz 1757, and was buried in the "Kehal Hasidim" section of the Mount of Olives Jewish cemetery, near the grave of R' Shalom Sharabi.

His son, R' Yom Tov Algazi, was also appointed Rishon Letzion.

References

1680 births
1757 deaths
Burials at the Jewish cemetery on the Mount of Olives
People from İzmir
Smyrniote Jews
Sephardi Jews in Ottoman Palestine
Rishon LeZion (rabbi)